Wyoming Highway 317 (WYO 317) is a fairly short north-south  Wyoming state road in northeastern Platte County that serves Guernsey State Park as the south entrance.

Route description
Wyoming Highway 317 begins at U.S. Route 26 just west of town center of Guernsey. Highway 317 proceeds northward to Guernsey State Park where it ends at 1.66 miles.

The roadway continues as Lakeside Drive and crosses the Guernsey Dam, an earthfill dam on the North Platte River. Lakeside Drive then runs along the eastern side of the Guernsey Reservoir to the north park entrance and then out to Wyoming Highway 270 northeast of the park.

Major intersections

References

External links 

Wyoming State Routes 300-399
WYO 317 - US-26 to Guernsey State Park
Guernsey State Park

Transportation in Platte County, Wyoming
317